Ed Yen is an executive producer within the creative industry.  His work spans the continents of Asia, Europe, and North America. He has produced over 50 albums, more than 150 theatre plays, mastering for over 400 album works and collaborated with artists in many genres, including Asian stars such as Tracy Huang, Aaron Kwok  Tsai Chin, Ekin Cheng:zh-tw:鄭伊健, Luna Sea, and classical musicians such as YoYo Ma and Kenneth Kuo, Jazz masters such as Ernie Watts, Jeremy Monteiro, and other world-class musicians such as Anna Azusa Fujita on international projects.[3]

He is a pioneer in many aspects and is well known for his versatility of professional skills. In Taiwan, he produced the first female Rapper album, the best annual Classical and Pop Album voted by media, the first one from Taiwan on Billboard Newage Chart, the first album stepping into the Korean market, and the highest ticket sales record of children's theater (the Mokis) and Chinese Musical (Amber), the consultant of the world's largest cartoon film production company, the best online marketing, ring tone, ringback tone record for vary Portals, the first one hosted World Battle of the Band, Music Industry Forums among other resources of creative events and brands into Taiwan, China and International Market.

Ed Yen had successfully organized exhibitions and events by inviting top Taiwanese artists and VIPs endorsement programs of content marketing concept to pursue big data and creative business models for the entertainment industry. In recent years, Ed Yen is calling for collaboration of Entertainment and Cross-Industries, such as Visual Technologies and Blockchain Technology. A turn-key system shall be established for the crisis and demanding on the Environment Saving, and the International Charity needs.

Education
Ed Yen graduated from the School of Theatre Arts, National Institute of the Arts (Current Taipei National University of the Arts), majoring in theater scoring and minoring in stage design and performance. Then he went to EMBA in Global Fashion, NTNU for his further studies in arts, culture and luxury management.

Music career
Ed has produced classical and pop crossover albums primarily in Taiwan and Hong Kong and all the way build up the international top-level artist credits. He is one of the few nominees and winners of the three Golden Awards (Golden Bell Awards, Golden Melody Awards, and Golden Horse Awards that considered as Chinese Emmy Award, Grammy Award, Oscars Award respectively of which covers more than 1.5 Billion Chinese audiences and over 2 Billion potential consumers worldwide). Mr. Yen has mastered more than 400 albums for major and independent labels and scored for over 65 plays and films.  Ed has written songs and produced albums for pop artists including Tiger Huang, Tracy Huang, Aaron Kwok, Tsai Chin, Ekin Cheng, Showlen Maya, Berson Wang, Angus Tung, and Augustine Yeh. He has produced crossover records for classical musicians such as YoYo Ma, Rueben Chen, and Kenneth Kuo. He has co-produced with  Chang Hung-Yi, Chung Yiu-Kwong, Anna Azusa Fujita, Luna Sea, Ernie Watts, and Jeremy Monteiro. His scoring work for children musicals is still widely used in Paper Wind Mill's annual production (such as Romance of the Three Kingdoms) and during his Film Scoring works for The Story of a Gangster (1990), Jam (1998) and A Chance to Die (2000) he acted as the consultant for HongGuang Cartoon Film (the world's largest cartoon film production company) for more than 8 years. One of the most successful popular avant-garde musical - Amber, which toured throughout the Greater China region with premier ticketing at US$7.8 million in 2005, is still on the top-selling Chinese Musicals and replayed several times in the year 2005, 2006, 2008, 2010 and more recently 2018.

Business career
Exhibitions: Before 2011, Yen attending at different regions’ exhibitions and festivals in Arts, fashion, technology, and media for his A & R demanding. Since 2011, Ed has led the Taiwan delegation to major music and technology related festivals as a bridge and connector for the creative industry. He founded Applied Music Technology Company, GCA Entertainment and a Music In Cities Organization to achieve different goals for his clients from around the world. The festivals include SXSW, CMJ Music Marathon, New Music Summit and CMW in North America, MIDEM Cannes, London Calling, LSC in Europe, Music Matters in Asia. The delegation includes many of Taiwan's leading major label and independent artists, including Mayday, Jolin Tsai, A-Lin, Dwagie, Da Mouth, Sodagreen, MP Power, 1976, Echo, Vanness Wu, Chemical Monkey, Luan Dan A Xiang, Miss Ko, Bearbabes, Tizzy Bac, MATZKA, Joanna Wang, Deserts Xuan, Shin, Xiao Yu, DJ Noodle, Aristophanes, OVDS, DJ Salamander, DJ Ray Ray, DJ Question Mark, DJ Cookie ...over 160 artists in total, to name a few.

Events:Taipei 101 Fireworks Music Production and International PR:Since 2014–2016, Ed was the executive producer for the Taipei 101 Fireworks and Music event. The year-long event hosted music artists nominated for the Golden Melody Awards and Golden Indie Music Awards. Using Taipei 101, as the world's tallest green building and as a center for arts and fashion, the event became a collaborative showcase for both the local and international creative industry to build endorsement business with brands and agencies. In Year 2016, Ed Yen hosted the project - International Marching Band Festival in Gia-Yi City, the largest event of this sort in Asia.

Governmental Projects: In 2006–2011, Ed Yen Cooperated with SSEG (SMG Group Companies) to host the program of National Level Music Park in Shanghai, focusing on Tax-Free Zone and Digital Public Broadcasting System for CI industries, Fin-tech Innovations and Film Industries. In 2011 to 2012, Ed was appointed by the Taiwan Ministry of Culture as the coordinator of the Popular Music Office. In this role, he was responsible for policy, industry analysis, and international economic development of the Taiwan pop music industry. In 2007 to present, Ed Yen host the program for the Golden Melody Judge Panel System with his IT team, GMA is considered as Chinese Grammys. Then, Ed and his team develop two other systems for Golden Melody Awards, Golden Bells Awards Judge Panel System. These are the highest level of awards in Chinese society of which covers 1.5 billion audiences connected through either traditional TV or internet in Greater China.

Mr. Yen started his career as a Beijing-based producer responsible for both event performance and broadcasting of the Asian Games on behalf of the International Olympic Committee. He has also served as Special Assistant to the President of EMI DJ Records where he worked in A&R, business development, production, and creative strategy.

Record Labels: Ed Yen worked for majors as Producers, projectors or marketing directors, A & R directors in different phases. Due to his Film Scoring and Theatre Background, He managed classical music, cross-over and pop music under Majors (Sony, EMI, Polygram, BMG) and Indies, such as EMI DJ Records, Jingoes, Rock Records, MNW (the largest Swedish Indies label), Nettwerk Music Group(Canada), BBC Radio Classics, Naxos, Disky (merged by EMI later), with numerous well known artists, such as Avril Lavigne (used to be Nettwerk), Borson(used to be MNW), Bebell Gilberto (Signed to Universal now) to name a few.

Awards

</ref>Golden Horse and Golden Bell() awards.

Patents

Music Works

References

External links
 
 Official GCA Entertainment website

A&R people
Taiwanese film score composers
Living people
Place of birth missing (living people)
Taiwanese record producers
Taiwanese audio engineers
Taiwanese businesspeople
Taiwanese composers
Year of birth missing (living people)